The western wood pewee (Contopus sordidulus) is a small tyrant flycatcher. Adults are gray-olive on the upperparts with light underparts, washed with olive on the breast. They have two wing bars and a dark bill with yellow at the base of the lower mandible. This bird is very similar in appearance to the eastern wood pewee; the two birds were formerly considered to be one species. The call of C. sordidulus is a loud buzzy peeer; the song consists of three rapid descending tsees ending with a descending peeer.

Description 
Measurements:

 Length: 5.5-6.3 in (14-16 cm)
 Weight: 0.4-0.5 oz (11-14 g)
 Wingspan: 10.2 in (26 cm)

Habitat and ecology

Their breeding habitat is open wooded areas in western North America. These birds migrate to South America at the end of summer. The female lays two or three eggs in an open cup nest on a horizontal tree branch or within a tree cavity; California black oak forests are examples of suitable nesting habitat for this species of bird. Both parents feed the young.

They wait on a perch at a middle height in a tree and fly out to catch insects in flight (hawking), sometimes hovering to pick insects from vegetation (gleaning).

References
Cornell Lab of Ornithology: Western Wood-pewee Species Account
C. Michael Hogan (2008) Quercus kelloggii, Globaltwitcher.com, ed. N. Stromberg

Line notes

External links

Videos, photos and sounds - Internet Bird Collection
Photos - VIREO
Photo-High Res; Article – "Utah Birds"–(clickable Photo Gallery)

western wood pewee
Native birds of Western Canada
Native birds of the Western United States
Birds of Mexico
Birds of the Sierra Madre Occidental
Birds of the Sierra Madre Oriental
Birds of the Sierra Madre del Sur
Birds of the Trans-Mexican Volcanic Belt
Birds of Central America
western wood pewee
western wood pewee